The Xorret de Catí is a mountain in the Prebaetic System, southern Spain. It spans the province of Alicante.
Xorret de Catí is open throughout the year.

Cycling

Xorret de Catí is one of the most famous cycling climbs in the Valencia region. It instantly become a hit with fans since its first appearance in the 1998 Vuelta a España - a stage won by tragic climber Chava Jiménez. The climb beginning just south of Castalla is undoubtedly the star side of Xorret de Catí, with consistently steep gradients - at times in excess of 20% - testing even the strongest of climbers.

Appearances in Vuelta a España

See also
Mountains of the Valencian Community

References

External links
 Google Maps

Xorret de Catí
Alacantí
Climbs in cycle racing in Spain